Keeranur may refer to the following places in Tamil Nadu, India:
 Keeranur, Dindigul, a panchayat town
 Keeranur, Kumbakonam, a village
 Keeranur, Pudukkottai, a panchayat
Keeranur, Vennandur, a Village panchayat

See also 
 Konrangi Keeranur, a panchayat town in Tamil Nadu, India
 Keeran (disambiguation)